In Buddhist thought, a bodhisattva (Hindi, Devanagari: बोधिसत्व; Burmese: ဗောဓိသတ်;Sinhalese:බෝධිසත්ව ; ; Khmer:ពោធិសត្វ; Thai: โพธิสัตว์;  ; Vietnamese: Bồ Tát) is a being who is dedicated to achieving complete Buddhahood. Conventionally, the term is applied to beings with a high degree of enlightenment. Bodhisattva literally means a "bodhi (enlightenment) being" in Pali and Sanskrit. Mahayana practitioners have historically lived in many other countries that are now predominantly Hindu or Muslim; remnants of reverence for bodhisattvas has continued in some of these regions.

The following is a non-exhaustive list of bodhisattvas primarily respected in Buddhism.

Primary Bodhisattvas

 Ākāśagarbha

, Khmer: អាកាសគភ៌; Thai: พระอากาศครรภโพธิสัตว์; sinhalese:ආකාශගර්භ ;) is a bodhisattva who is associated with the great element (mahābhūta) of space (ākāśa).

 Avalokiteśvara (Padmapani)

The bodhisattva of compassion, the listener of the world's cries who uses skillful means to come to their aid; the most universally acknowledged bodhisattva in Mahayana Buddhism, also appears in Theravada and Vajrayana Buddhism. This bodhisattva gradually became identified predominantly as female in East Asian Buddhism and its name may originally have been Avalokitāśvara.

 Kṣitigarbha

(Khmer: ក្សិតិគភ៌; Mongolian: Сайенинбу; sinhalese:කශිතිගර්භ ;Thai: พระกษิติครรภโพธิสัตว์).

Kṣitigarbha is a bodhisattva primarily revered in East Asian Buddhism and usually depicted as a Buddhist monk. His name may be translated as "Earth Treasury", "Earth Store", "Earth Matrix", or "Earth Womb". Kṣitigarbha is known for his vow to take responsibility for the instruction of all beings in the six worlds between the death of Gautama Buddha and the rise of Maitreya, as well as his vow not to achieve Buddhahood until all hells are emptied. He is therefore often regarded as the bodhisattva of hell-beings, as well as the guardian of children and patron deity of deceased children in Japanese culture.

 Mahāsthāmaprāpta

(Khmer: មហាស្ថាមប្រាប្ត; sinhalese:මහාස්තාමප්‍රාප්ත ; Thai: พระมหาสถามปราปต์โพธิสัตว์; Tibetan: མཐུ་ཆེན་ཐོབ)

Mahāsthāmaprāpta (Korean: Daeseji) is a mahāsattva representing the power of wisdom, often depicted in a trinity with Amitābha and Avalokiteśvara, especially in Pure Land Buddhism. His name literally means "arrival of the great strength".

 Maitreya, (Pali: Metteyya)

In some Buddhist texts such as the Amitabha Sutra and the Lotus Sutra, he is referred to as Ajita.

According to Buddhism, Maitreya is regarded as the future buddha. Buddhist tradition, Maitreya is a bodhisattva who will appear on Earth in the future, achieve complete enlightenment, and teach the pure dharma. According to scriptures, Maitreya will be a successor to the present Buddha, Gautama Buddha. The prophecy of the arrival of Maitreya refers to a time in the future when the dharma will have been forgotten by most on the terrestrial world. This prophecy is found in the canonical literature of all major schools of Buddhism. Maitreya has also been adopted for his millenarian role by many non-Buddhist religions in the past such as the White Lotus as well as by modern new religious movements such as Yiguandao.

 Mañjuśrī

(Khmer: មញ្ចុស្រី; Mongolian: Зөөлөн эгшигт;sinhalese:මංජුශ්‍රී ; Thai: พระมัญชุศรีโพธิสัตว์)

Mañjuśrī is a bodhisattva associated with prajñā (transcendent wisdom) in Mahayana Buddhism. In Tibetan Buddhism, he is also a yidam. His name means "Gentle Glory". Mañjuśrī is also known by the fuller Sanskrit name of Mañjuśrīkumārabhūta, literally "Mañjuśrī, Still a Youth" or, less literally, "Prince Mañjuśrī".

 Samantabhadra

Samantabhadra Universal Worthy is associated with practice and meditation. Together with the Buddha and Mañjuśrī, he forms the Shakyamuni trinity in Buddhism. He is the patron of the Lotus Sutra and, according to the Avatamsaka Sutra, made the ten great vows which are the basis of a bodhisattva. In China, Samantabhadra is associated with action, whereas Mañjuśrī is associated with prajñā. In Japan, Samantabharda is often venerated by the Tendai and in Shingon Buddhism, and as the protector of the Lotus Sutra by Nichiren Buddhism.

 Vajrapāṇi, (Pali: Vajirapāṇi)

(Khmer: វជ្របាណិ; sinhalese: වජ්‍රපානි ;Thai: พระวัชรปาณีโพธิสัตว์)

 (Sanskrit, "Vajra  in [his] hand") is one of the earliest-appearing bodhisattvas in Mahayana Buddhism. He is the protector and guide of Gautama Buddha and rose to symbolize the Buddha's power.

Vajrapāṇi is extensively represented in Buddhist iconography as one of the three protective deities surrounding the Buddha. Each of them symbolizes one of the Buddha's virtues: Mañjuśrī manifests all the Buddhas' wisdom, Avalokiteśvara manifests all the Buddhas' compassion and Vajrapāṇi manifests all the Buddhas' power as well as the power of all five tathāgatas. Vajrapāṇi is one of the earliest dharmapalas mentioned in the Pāli Canon as well as be worshiped in the Shaolin Monastery, in Tibetan Buddhism and in Pure Land Buddhism, where he is known as Mahasthamaprapta and forms a triad with Amitābha and Avalokiteśvara.

They are two wrathful and muscular guardians of the Buddha standing today at the entrance of many Buddhist temples in East Asian Buddhism and are said to be dharmapala manifestations of Vajrapāṇi. They are also seen as a manifestations of Mahasthamaprapta in Pure Land Buddhism and as Vajrasattva in Tibetan Buddhism. In some texts, he is also described as the manifestation of Sakka, the ruler of Tavatimsa Devas.

According to Japanese tradition, they traveled with Gautama Buddha to protect him, reminiscent of Vajrapāṇi's role in the Ambaṭṭha Sutta of the Pali Canon. Within the generally pacifist tradition of Buddhism, stories of dharmapalas justified the use of physical force to protect cherished values and beliefs against evil. Vajrapāṇi is also associated with Acala, who is venerated as Fudō-Myō in Japan, where he is serenaded as the holder of the vajra.

Classification

Four Great Bodhisattvas
There are several lists of four Bodhisattvas according to scripture and local tradition.

Popular Chinese Buddhism generally lists the following, as they are associated with the Four Sacred Mountains:

Avalokiteśvara
Kṣitigarbha
Mañjuśrī
Samantabhadra

The Womb Realm Mandala of Esoteric Buddhism provides another enumeration. These bodhisattvas are featured in the Eight Petal Hall in the center of the mandala. They are as follows: 
Samantabhadra
Mañjuśrī
Avalokiteśvara
Maitreya

The Avataṃsaka Sūtra mentions four bodhisattvas, each of whom expounds a portion of the Fifty-two Stages of Bodhisattva Practice.
Dharmaprajñā
Guṇavana
Vajraketu
Vajragarbha

The Lotus Sutra provides a list of bodhisattvas that are the leaders of the Bodhisattvas of the Earth.
Viśiṣṭacāritra
Anantacāritra
Viśuddhacāritra
Supratiṣṭhitacāritra

Five Great Bodhisattvas

Chapter 7 of the Humane King Sutra provides an enumeration of five bodhisattvas, known as the "Five Bodhisattvas of Great Power (五大力菩薩)." There are two Chinese translations of this text, each providing an entirely different name to these figures. Their association with the cardinal directions also differs between versions. They are as follows:

Ten Bodhisattvas 

Ten Bodhisattas refer to ten future Buddhas as successors of Shakyamuni (Gautama) Buddha, in the following order.They are introduced as:"Metteyyo Uttamo Rāmo, Paseno Kosalobibū, Dīghasoṇīca Caṅkīca, Subo, Todeyya Brahmano. Nāḷāgirī Pālileyyo, Bhodhisatthā imedasa anukkamena sabhodiṁ, pāpuṇissanti nāgate".

 The noble Maitreya Buddha
 King Uttararama
 King Pasenadi of Kosala
 Abhibhū
 Dīghasoṇī
 Caṅkī (Candanī)
 Subha
 A Brahmin named, Todeyya
 An elephant named, Nāḷāgirī
 The king of elephants, named Pālileyya

Sixteen Bodhisattvas
The Niṣpannayogāvalī provides a list of bodhisattvas known as the "Sixteen Honored Ones of the Auspicious Aeon." They also appear in a Sutra with the same title (賢劫十六尊). They are as follows, along with their respective associated directions:

Another set of sixteen are known as the "Sixteen Great Bodhisattvas" and make up a portion of the Diamond Realm Mandala. They are associated with the Buddhas of the cardinal directions.

Twenty-five Bodhisattvas
According to the Sūtra on Ten Methods of Rebirth in Amitābha Buddha's Land (十往生阿彌陀佛國經), those people who are devoted to attaining rebirth in the Western Pure Land are protected by a great number of bodhisattvas. Twenty-five of them are given by name:

Avalokiteśvara
Mahāsthāmaprāpta
Bhaiṣajyarāja
Bhaiṣajyasamudgata
Samantabhadra
Dharmeśvara
Siṃhanāda
Dhāraṇī
Ākāśagarbha
Guṇagarbha
Ratnagarbha
Vajragarbha
Vajra
Girisāgaramati
Raśmiprabharāja
Avataṃsakarāja
Gaṇaratnarāja
Candraprabharāja
Divākararāja
Samādhirāja
Samādhīśvararāja
Maheśvararāja
Śuklahastarāja
Mahātejarāja
Anantakāya

Misc
 Padmasambhāva

Padmasambhāva "Lotus-Born", also known as Guru Rinpoche, is a literary character of terma, an emanation of Amitābha that is said to appear to tertöns in visionary encounters and a focus of Tibetan Buddhist practice, particularly in the Nyingma school.

 Sangharama
()

Only revered in Chinese Buddhism and Taoism, Sangharama refer to a group of devas who guard viharas and the faith, but the title is usually referring to the legendary Chinese military general Guan Yu, who became a dharmapala through becoming a Buddhist and making vows.

Sitātapatrā
())

Sitātapatrā "the White Parasol" is a protector against supernatural danger. She is venerated in both Mahayana and Vajrayana traditions. She is also known as Uṣṇīṣa Sitatapatra. Sitātapatrā is a powerful independent deity as she was emanated by Gautama Buddha from his uṣṇīṣa. Whoever practices her mantra will be reborn in Amitābha's pure land as well as gaining protection against supernatural danger and black magic.

 Skanda

,)
Skanda is regarded as a devoted guardian of viharas and the Buddhist teachings. He is the leader of the twenty-four celestial guardian deities mentioned in the Golden Light Sutra. In Chinese temples, Skanda faces the statue of the Buddha in the main shrine. In others, he is on the far right of the main shrine, whereas on the left is his counterpart, Sangharama, personified as the historical general Guan Yu. In Chinese sutras, his image is found at the end of the sutra, a reminder of his vow to protect and preserve the teachings.

 Supuṣpacandra
Mentioned in Shantideva's Bodhisattvacaryāvatāra.

Sūryaprabha
(Ch: 日光, Rìguāng, Kr. Ilgwang, Jp: Nikkō) One of two attendants of Bhaisajyaguru, together with Candraprabha.

Candraprabha
(Ch: 月光, Yuèguāng, Kr. Wolgwang, Jp: Gakkō) One of two attendants of Bhaisajyaguru, together with Sūryaprabha.

 Tara
(Ch. 多羅, Duō luó) Female bodhisattva, or set of bodhisattvas, in Tibetan Buddhism. She represents the virtues of success in work and achievements. Also a manifestation of Avalokiteśvara.

Vasudhārā

Vasudhārā whose name means "stream of gems" in Sanskrit, is the bodhisattva of wealth, prosperity, and abundance. She is popular in many Buddhist countries and is a subject in Buddhist legends and art. Originally an Indian bodhisattva, her popularity has spread to Theravadin countries. Her popularity, however, peaks in Nepal, where she has a strong following among the Buddhist Newars of the Kathmandu Valley and is thus a central figure in Newar Buddhism. She is named Shiskar Apa in Lahul and Spiti.

Agnidatta
Ākāṅkṣitamukha
Amoghadarśin
Anantamati
Anantapratibhāna
Anantavikrāmin
Anārambaṇadhyāyin
Anikṣiptadhura
Aniñjya
Anupalipta
Anupamamati
Aśokadatta, bodhisattva of the south
Āśvāsahasta
Bhadrapāla
Bhadraśrī
Brahmajāla
Bhaiṣajyasena
Buddhaghoṣa
Buddhiśrī
Candrabhānu
Candra­śrī
Candrasūryatrailokyadhārin
Caryamati, bodhisattva of the west
Daśa­śataraśmihutārci (or Daśaśataraśmikṛtārci)
Devarāja
Dhācaṅiṁdhara
Dhanaśrī
Dharaṇīdhara
Dharaṇīṃdhara
Dharaṇīśvararāja
Dharmadhara
Dharmaketu
Dharmakṣema
Dharmamati
Dharmavyūha
Dharmeśvara
Dhṛtiparipūrna
Dundubhisvara
Gadgadasvara
Gajagandhahastin
Gambhī­raghoṣasvaranā­dita
Gandhahastin
Guhyagupta
Harisiṃha
Indrajāla
Jālinīprabha
Jayadatta, bodhisattva of the north
Jayamati
Jñānadarśana
Jñānagarbha
Jñānākara
Jñānamati
Jñānaprabha
Jñāna­śrī
Jyotirasa
Kṣetralaṃkṛta
Lakṣaṇakūṭasamatikrānta
Lakṣaṇasamalaṁkṛta
Mahā­brahmā­śaṅku
Mahā­ghoṣasvararāja
Mahā­karuṇā­candrin
Mahāmati
Mahāmeru
Mahāpratibhāna
Mahāvikrāmin
Mahāvyūha
Maṇicūḍa
Maṇiratnacchattra
Mārajit
Mārapramardin
Megharāja
Meru
Merudhvaja
Merukūṭa
Merupradīparāja
Merurāja
Meru­śikharadhara
Meru­śikharasaṁghaṭṭanarāja
Merusvara
Nakṣatrarāja
Nakṣatrarājasaṃkusumitābhijña
Nārāyaṇa
Nityaprahasitapramuditendriya
Nityodyukta
Nityotkaṇṭhita
Nityotkṣiptahasta
Nityotpalakṛtahasta
Pradānaśūra
Padmagarbha
Padmanetra
Padmapāṇi, bodhisattva of the southeast
Padmaśrī
Padmaśrīgarbha
Padmavyūha
Padmottara, bodhisattva of the nadir
Prabhāketu
Prabhāvyūha
Prabhūtaratna
Prajdākūṭa
Prajñākūta
Pralānaśūra
Prāmodyarāja
Praṇidhiprayātaprāpta
Praśāntacāritramati
Pratibhānakūṭa
Pratisaṃvitpraṇādaprāpta
Pratisaṃvitprāpta
Pṛthivīvaralocana
Pūrṇacandra
Ratiṁkara
Ratnacandra
Ratnacūḍa
Ratnadhvaja
Ratnadvīpa
Ratnagarbha
Ratnajaha
Ratnajāli
Ratnākara
Ratnaketu
Ratnakūṭa
Ratnamudrā­hasta
Ratnamukuṭa
Ratnananda
Ratnapāṇi
Ratnaprabha
Ratnaprabhāsa
Ratnasaṁbhava
Ratnaśikhara
Ratnaśrī
Ratnayaṣṭi
Ratnavara, bodhisattva of the northwest
Ratnavīra
Ratnavyūha
Ratnayaṣṭin
Ratnolkā­dhārin
Sadāparibhūta, one of Śākyamuni's past lives
Sāgaramati
Sahacittotpādadharmacakrapravartin
Śaila­śikharasaṃghaṭṭanarāja
Samadarśin
Samādhigarbha
Samādhivikurvaṇarāja
Samantacandra
Samantacāritramati
Samantanetra
Samantaprabha, bodhisattva of the east
Samantaprāsā­dika
Samanteryapatha
Samatā­vihā­rin
Samaviṣamadarśin
Sarvabhayahara
Sarvamalā­pagata
Sarvamaṅgaladhārin
Sarvanīvaraṇaviṣkambhin
Sarvapuṇyalakṣaṇadhārin
Sarvārthanāman
Sarvasattvapriyadarśana
Sarvaśūra
Sarvatīrthamaṅgaladhārin
Satatamabhayaṁdad (or Satatamabhayaṁdadāna)
Satatasamitābhiyukta
Satatodyukta
Siṃha
Siṃhaketu
Siṃhaghoṣābhigarjita­śvara
Siṃhamati
Siṁhanādanādin
Siṁhavikrī­ḍita
Siddhārthamati
Śrī­garbha
Śubhagarbha
Śubhakanakaviśuddhiprabha
Śubhavimalagarbha
Sujāta
Sumati
Sumeru
Supratiṣṭhitabuddhi
Sūryagarbha
Sūryaprabha, bodhisattva of the southwest
Suvarnacūḍa
Suvarṇagarbha
Suvikrāntamati
Svaraviśuddhiprabha
Svaravyūha
Tathāgatagarbha
Trailokyarikrāmin
Uṣṇīṣavijayā
Uttaramati
Vairocana
Vairocanarāśmipratimaṅḍitadhvajarājan
Vajragarbha
Vajramati
Vajrasena
Vardamānamati
Varuṇa
Vidyuddeva
Vidyutdeva
Vijayavikrāmin, bodhisattva of the northeast
Vikurvaṇarāja
Vimalagarbha
Vimalanetra
Vimukticandra
Vi­śālanetra
Viśeṣamati
Vyūharāja

References

Newar
Bodhisattvas
Bodhisattvas